María Fernanda Cabal Molina (born 8 August 1964) is a Colombian businesswoman, political scientist and politician. In the legislative elections of 2014 she was elected as a representative to the Chamber for Bogotá with the endorsement of the Democratic Center, and in 2018 she was elected as senator of the republic by the same community.In 2022, she was re-elected to the Senate with the highest vote, within the open lists, among women.

Cabal is known for her conservative positions.As a member of congress, she maintained close relations with the Donald Trump administration in the United States and Jair Bolsonaro of Brazil, as well as being a constant critic of leftist movements in Colombia and Latin America. She is in favor of controversial policies such as promoting the right of civilians to bear arms to defend themselves and the rejection of the peace agreement between the FARC guerrillas and the Colombian government.

References 

1964 births
Living people
Colombian businesspeople
Colombian political scientists
Women political scientists
Colombian women in politics
Members of the Senate of Colombia
Democratic Center (Colombia) politicians
University of Los Andes (Colombia) alumni
People from Cali